Roberto Fidel Ernesto Sorokin Esparza (born June 14, 1973, in Rosario, Santa Fe), who performs under the stage name Coti, is an Argentine singer-songwriter, best known for collaborations with other Spanish-language artists like Andrés Calamaro, Julieta Venegas, Natalia Oreiro and Luis Miguel in his last album. His 2005 release, Esta Mañana y Otros Cuentos went gold in both Argentina and Mexico, while going double platinum in Spain.

Early career
Coti was born in Rosario, Santa Fe, though he moved to Concordia, Entre Ríos at the age of three. Upon returning to Rosario, he joined the group Luz Mala, which recorded an album.

In the late 1990s, he penned songs for Andrés Calamaro, Julieta Venegas, Paulina Rubio, Natalia Oreiro, Los Enanitos Verdes, Diego Torres, and Alejandro Lerner. Striking out on his own, he released his first album, Coti, in Spain, getting enough air time from the single Antes que ver el sol to secure him a spot as the opening act for the Spanish stop of Shakira's 2003 tour, Tour of the Mongoose. He was a co-writer of songs in Julieta Venegas's Latin Grammy winning album Sí and Grammy album and Latin Grammy winning Limón y Sal.

In 2009, Coti appeared in a music video with Maxi Rodríguez, former player Diego Forlán, and Cerezo Osaka respectively.

Discography
 Coti (2002)
 Canciones Para Llevar (2004)
 Esta Mañana y Otros Cuentos (2005)
 Gatos y Palomas (2007)
 Malditas Canciones (2009)
 Lo dije por boca de otro (2012)
 Que Esperas (2015)
 Tanta Magia (En Vivo En El Gran Rex)'' (2015)

References
 Official site

Notes

1973 births
Living people
Argentine male guitarists
Argentine male singer-songwriters
Argentine people of Russian-Jewish descent
Argentine people of Ukrainian-Jewish descent
Jewish Argentine musicians
Singers from Rosario, Santa Fe
Universal Music Latin Entertainment artists
Latin music songwriters
21st-century Argentine male singers
21st-century guitarists